Mucilaginibacter paludis is a facultatively aerobic and heterotrophic bacterium from the genus of Mucilaginibacter which has been isolated from acidic Sphagnum peat bog in western Siberia in Russia. Mucilaginibacter paludis has the ability to degrade pectin, xylan and laminarin.

References

Further reading

External links
Type strain of Mucilaginibacter paludis at BacDive -  the Bacterial Diversity Metadatabase	

Sphingobacteriia
Bacteria described in 2007